The International Civil Society Centre (or ICS Centre) is a civil society organisation founded in 2007, located in Berlin. The organisation was initially founded under the name of Berlin Civil Society Centre as a not-for-profit company (GmbH) by Peter Eigen, former chair of the Extractive Industries Transparency Initiative (EITI) and founder of Transparency International. It was co-founded by Burkhard Gnärig, former CEO of Save the Children International, Greenpeace Germany and terre des hommes Germany.

The team is composed of 16 persons, with Wolfgang Jamann as executive director.

Organisation
The International Civil Society Centre's work focuses on leadership support, future trends and sector services. The organisation is owned by 15 associated international civil society organisations, which work across environmental, human rights, social justice and humanitarian issues: 

 ADRA International
 Amnesty International
 CARE International
 CBM International
 ChildFund Alliance
 HelpAge International
 Islamic Relief Worldwide
 Oxfam International
 Plan International
 Save the Children
 Sightsavers International
 SOS Children's Villages
 Transparency International
 VSO International
 World Vision International

The shareholder organisations all hold equal shares in the centre and are its highest decision-making body. They meet twice a year to elect members to the centre's Board of Trustees, hear reports on the centre's work and approve the centre's budget and audited accounts.

The role of the centre's board of trustees is to monitor the management of the organisation.  

The centre's work is also supported by international civil society organisations who are its Core Supporters. These are organisations who pay annual contributions and are involved with the work of the centre but do not own any shares.

Programmes 
The International Civil Society Centre's work focuses on three aspects: Convening, Futures and Innovation, and Collaboration.

Its convening role allows for workshops and conferences where civil society practitioners connect, collaborate and co-create. The Futures and Innovation programme gathers research on the latest innovations and analyse how they can help ICSOs achieve greater impact; while scanning for future developments that could influence civil society's relevance. As for the collaborative aspect, it allows for events which gather many different civil society members.

The Leave No One Behind partnership 
One of the International Civil Society Centre's biggest project in scale and partners is its Leave No One Behind Partnership. Initiated by a dozen international civil society organisations, the partnership brings together actors from local to international level, with the aim to forge a more participative and inclusive implementation of the Sustainable Development Goals. The coalition aims to fill knowledge gaps on marginalisation (making voices heard) and to advocate for evidence-based policy making at national and global level (making voices count). Its mapping has found that governments often lack knowledge about people living at the margins of society and are thus unable to adequately address their needs. At the same time, civil society organisations command a wealth of knowledge on marginalised communities, as they interact with them on a day-to-day basis. That's why a majority of the centre's owners decided to jointly collect and share data, bringing it to the attention of decision-makers to enable evidence-driven policy making. The pilot project launched in five countries: Bangladesh, India, Kenya, Nepal and Vietnam. Based on learnings, the partnership will build on its pilot with a four-year project from March 2019, to scale up to 20 countries by 2022.

Innovation in Civil Society 
To their advantage, many ICSOs constantly innovate and experiment with new approaches. However, there is a significant opportunity for organisations to benefit more from the lessons others have learned or are in the process of addressing. To fill this gap, the Centre provides a space where innovation can be showcased, analysed and discussed. It does so thanks to its Innovation in Civil Society report, another important project led by the centre. The report is an annual, interactive multimedia format that shares such insights and analyses, on innovations related to pressing themes. As a facilitator and recognised thought leader in the sector, the Centre convenes ICSOs with new strategic partners, leading trendsetters, experimenters and implementers on local and global level to provoke thoughtful analysis and practices that can trigger responsive action.

The Solidarity Action Network (SANE) 
The Solidarity Action Network brings together international civil society organisations and their local partners to support each other when faced with undue threats and challenges to their operations or civic space restrictions more broadly. It enhances cooperative mechanisms for joint actions beyond public statements of solidarity to push back against clampdowns on civil society.

The network holds two primary functions:

 Collecting and sharing knowledge, experiences, and best practices to create a ‘Solidarity Playbook’ to help other civil society actors to respond to threats and challenges.
 Enabling exchange of best practices and inspiring collaborative actions – mainly connecting development and humanitarian ICSOs with an operational or a partner presence on the ground and bringing them into discussions on challenges and opportunities related to civic space.

External links 
 Official website
The Leave No One Behind Partnership website
The Solidarity Action Network (SANE) website
The Innovation Reports website
 Website of the INGO Accountability Charter

References

Think tanks based in Germany
International organisations based in Germany